This is a list of Billboard magazine's top popular songs of 1952 by retail sales.

See also
1952 in music
List of number-one singles of 1952 (U.S.)

References

1952 record charts
Billboard charts